Sangaris seabrai is a species of beetle in the family Cerambycidae. It was described by Dmytro Zajciw in 1962. It is known from Brazil.

References

seabrai
Beetles described in 1962